Charlotte Gill is a Canadian fiction and non-fiction writer.

Her short story collection Ladykiller won the Ethel Wilson Fiction Prize and the Danuta Gleed Literary Award in 2006, and was a finalist for the Governor General's Award for English-language fiction at the 2005 Governor General's Awards. Her non-fiction book Eating Dirt: Deep Forests, Big Timber, and Life with the Tree-Planting Tribe won the Hubert Evans Non-Fiction Prize in 2012, and was a shortlisted finalist for the Charles Taylor Prize and the Hilary Weston Writers' Trust Prize for Nonfiction.

Gill and her husband both formerly worked as professional tree planters.

References

External links
Charlotte Gill

Canadian non-fiction writers
Writers from British Columbia
Living people
Canadian women short story writers
21st-century Canadian short story writers
21st-century Canadian women writers
Canadian women non-fiction writers
Year of birth missing (living people)